George Warren Wood (known professionally as George W. Wood) (1814–1901) was a Presbyterian minister and missionary who became the secretary of the Congregationalist American Board of Commissioners for Foreign Missions. He was an early missionary to Armenia under Cyrus Hamlin.

His son, also named George Warren Wood, was also a Presbyterian reverend and missionary. G. W. Wood Jr. (born in 1844 in Turkey, died January 21, 1924, in Fairhope, Alabama) served Presbyterian missions in Charlevoix, Michigan (1870s), the Montana Territory(1880s), and the Michilimackinaw area (1890s) before retiring to Alabama in 1901 to help start the Fairhope Single Tax Corporation.

Early life 
Dr. Wood was born February 28, 1814, to Samuel and Mehitable (Peabody) Wood in Bradford, Massachusetts, near Haverhill, Massachusetts. Wood attended Bradford Academy and then graduated from Dartmouth College in 1832. After teaching in a religious school in Elizabeth, NJ for four years and studying theology, Dr. Wood entered Princeton Theological Seminary for 6 months before being licensed and ordained as an evangelist by the Presbytery of Elizabethtown.

Career in missions

Mission work in Istanbul and elsewhere 

He was ordained a Presbyterian missionary, at Morristown, N.J., on May 20, 1837. With his wife Martha, he served in Singapore East India (May 1838 – June 1840); Smyrna (1842), Trebizond Eyalet in the Ottoman Empire (1842–1843), eight years at Istanbul (March 1842 – July 1850), and associated with the Rev. Cyrus Hamlin in the Bebek Seminary. He became in charge of Bebek's Theological department, the first of its kind in Asia Minor

Return to the United States and work for the American Board 
In 1850 he returned to the United States. In September  1852 he was elected Corresponding Secretary of the American Board of Foreign Missions in New York City, and continued in this position until 1871.

In Spring 1855, the ABCFM sent Dr. Wood to visit Choctaw Mission in Oklahoma to resolve a crisis over the abolition issue. After arriving in Stockbridge Mission, Wood spent over two weeks days visiting missions including the Goodwater Mission, Wheelock Academy, Spencer Academy, and other mission schools. He met with missionaries to discuss Selah B Treat's June 22, 1848, letter permitting them to maintain fellowship with slaveholders. Ultimately, the crisis was not resolved, and by 1859, the Board cut ties to the Choctaw mission altogether.

In 1856, Dr. Wood published a "Manual of Christian Theology" in Constantinople in association with Dr. H. G. O. Dwight and Rev. Dr. Edward Riggs.

In addition to his other secretarial duties, Wood assisted in presiding over the historic closure and relocation of the original Broadway Tabernacle in New York City in 1857.

In December 1862, Dr. Wood sailed from New York on his way to assist the Western Turkey Mission with his skills in the Armenian language. He stopped in London for several weeks to meet with the Turkish Missions Aid Society and arrived in Constantinople on March 7, 1863. During this time he also visited the Syria Mission. He returned to the United States June 6, 1864.

Return to missions in Turkey 
When the New School Presbyterians withdrew from the American Board, Dr. Wood resumed his missions work in Constantinople for another 16 years from 1871 to 1886. While in Constantinople in 1879, Wood reported Turkish authorities in Amasia brutally persecuting Christian Armenian refugees from Soukoum Kaleh during the Russo-Turkish War (1877–78). He was able to coordinate with British Diplomat Edward Malet to bring the matter to the attention of the Sublime Porte, and then to the British foreign secretary Robert Gascoyne-Cecil (the Marquess of Salisbury).

Personal life

Marriages 
Dr. Wood had four wives over the course of his life.
 Dr. Wood married Martha Maria Johnson (Daughter of Silas & Mary Johnson) on April 24, 1838, and she died in childbirth March 9, 1839.
 He married again Martha Briggs (Daughter of William Briggs of Boston) on December 29, 1841, in Philadelphia, Pennsylvania. Mary bore four children (Sarah Johnson 1842, George Warren 1844, Louisa Whitehead 1846, and Henry Magie(sp?) 1849) in Turkey before she returned to the USA 1850–1851 on account of health, and died May 13, 1852.
 He married a third time, to Mary C Hastings (daughter of Thomas Hastings of New York City, and widow of Daniel Bond ) on January 18, 1855. Mary died March 4, 1862.
 In 1869, Wood married a fourth time, to Mrs. Sara Ann (McNair) Heylmun, who died August 17, 1901.

Death 
Dr. Wood and his 4th wife (S.A. H. Wood) both died in 1901 and are buried together in the Mount Morris City Cemetery in Livingston County, New York.

Children 
Dr. Wood was survived by one son and one daughter.

George Warren Wood, Junior 

Dr. G.W. Wood's son, also named George Warren Wood, was also a Presbyterian reverend and missionary.

Early life 
G. W. Wood Jr. was born in 1844 in Turkey  as his father was a missionary there. After graduating from Hamilton College in Upstate New York in 1865, he taught and pursued advanced studies at the college of the City of New York. He graduated from Union Theological Seminary in New York City in 1869.

Early missionary career in Michigan 

Rev. Wood, Jr became ordained as a Presbyterian pastor in the Saginaw Presbytery and domestic missionary for the Presbyterian Board of Home Missions in Au Sable and Oscoda in January 1872. He married Harriet Snyder in May 1872 in Iosco County and then arrived in Charlevoix, Michigan in late November 1872. to be appointed a Home Missionary in that place in 1873. Wood, Jr. ministered in Charlevoix, Michigan, and Bear River, Michigan, from January 1874 to 1879. During 1877–1879, he worked as a colporteur in the same region (reaching mainly homesteaders throughout Emmet County and Charlevoix County) for the American Bible Society rather than for the Presbyterian Board of Home Missions. Wood, Jr. had been a lifetime member of the ABS since at least 1873.

Missionary work in Dakotas and Montana 

He was a missionary at the Dakota Mission (Fort Peck/Wolf Point) from 1879-1889. The first Presbyterian presence on the Fort Peck Indian Reservation began when Wood worked with the Native American (primarily Assiniboine and Sioux) population in 1881 and established a mission day school for children in 1883 on the north bank of the Missouri River, about three-quarters of a mile from present-day Wolf Point. During Wood's tenure in Montana, the natives grappled with the establishment of Camp Poplar River by the 11th Infantry, construction of the Montana Central Railway (later known as the Great Northern Railway), arrival of white settlers, US bans on the Sun Dance and other cultural practices, extinction of the Buffalo in northeast Montana, and starvation during extremely harsh winters. In 1884, Wood oversaw a mission that was suffering from extreme poverty and starvation, and the Indian Rights Association convinced Congress to make a special appropriation. From 1885 to Montana Statehood in 1889, the tribes associated with Wood in the Dakota Mission participated in agreements with the US government to re-drawing the boundaries of the Fort Peck reservation in exchange for federal subsidies. The Presbyterian community he started there became "Union Church" in 1914 and celebrated its centennial in 2014 as "First Presbyterian Church" in Wolf Point.

Later missionary career in Northern Michigan 

In 1892, Wood, Jr. was in Boyne, Michigan, publishing a newspaper called "The Ensign" From 1892 to 1893 Wood, Jr. was a home missionary in Lakefield, Michigan, in the upper peninsula of Michigan. Starting in 1892, Wood was the editor and publisher of a weekly newspaper at Mackinaw City called the "Mackinaw Witness.

In 1894, Wood hosted Alabama native and missionary, Dr. George A. Weaver, as a fundraiser for the American Sunday School Union in the Mackinaw area.

In 1894 Wood's Witness was listed as the sole newspaper published in Mackinaw City, and continued to be published by him in 1897. " In October 1897, the Cheboygan Democrat profiled the struggling Mackinaw Witness news operation and remarked that Rev Wood and his son George H. Wood were editor and manager respectively. The review noted that the Witness contained much "curious information" including railroad timetables, [lost] "cats and dogs", minor news, Sabbath Readings, New Earth columns, and "snide advertising" for questionable gold mining companies, single tax theory, crank books, and the Scientific American. In November 1897, Wood wrote a letter in the Witness regarding his new colony on Mobile Bay in Alabama called the Fairhope Industrial Association.

Progressive Era Politics and Retirement in Alabama 

During the Progressive Era, Wood, Jr. moved to Fairhope, Alabama, around 1900 (as early as 1897 or 1898). His daughter Sarah Louise Wood married Fairhope pioneer Clement LeFavre Coleman in 1902, and in 1903, George Wood became a charter member  of the Fairhope Single Tax Corporation. He was Secretary of the FSTC in 1905, and was its treasurer from 1908 to at least 1912. In 1912, Wood, Jr.'s biography was listed in Herringshaw's American blue book of biography. As part of the FSTC, Wood became a member of the Fairhope Wharf Company in December 1912 and became president of the wharf company in January 1913. Wood, Jr. lived in Fairhope as late as 1919, where he complained to the National Voters' League about extortion by the railway companies. His wife Harriet Snyder Wood, after bearing Wood, Jr. two sons and five daughters, died in Mount Pleasant, Washington, D.C. in 1922.  George Warren Wood Jr. died in 1924.

References 

1814 births
1901 deaths
American Congregationalist missionaries
Congregationalist missionaries in Singapore
Congregationalist missionaries in India
Congregationalist missionaries in Turkey
Protestant missionaries in Armenia
American expatriates in Singapore
American expatriates in India
American expatriates in the Ottoman Empire
Congregationalist missionaries in the Ottoman Empire
People from Bradford, Massachusetts
People from Charlevoix, Michigan
People from Petoskey, Michigan
People from Wolf Point, Montana